Evanescent skin lesions, like wheals, are those that last for less than 24 hours before resolving.

See also
 Skin lesion

References

 
Dermatologic terminology